David Neville (born June 1, 1984) is an American sprinter who specializes in the 400 meters  and two-time medalist (one gold, one bronze) in the Summer Olympics.  A native of Merrillville, Indiana, Neville became the first individual track and field medalist out of Indiana University since Willie May won silver in the 110-meter hurdles in 1960.

Career

Neville attended Merrillville High School from 1998-2002 where he ran track and field.  He then moved to Indiana University where he competed from 2003 until 2006 winning several individual Big Ten conference titles and being named an All-American.

At the 2008 Summer Olympic, Neville won a bronze medal in the men's 400 m with a time of 44.80 seconds. Neville then teamed with LaShawn Merritt, Angelo Taylor, and Jeremy Wariner in the 4x400 m relay to finish first with an Olympic record time of 2:55.39.  Neville clocked a split of 44.16 seconds.

Personal bests

Personal life
Neville is a Christian. After retiring from running, Neville took the Head Coaching position at Taylor University Men's and Women's Track and Field. There he recruited several Division 1 caliber athletes such as NAIA Champion Caleb Anthony (400m Hurdles), Crossroads League Champion Sam Lacher (400m), and Luke Wilson (High Jump) before moving on the University of Tennessee - Knoxville to lead the Olympian filled sprint squad in 2017.

In 2016 Neville competed in American Grit, finishing in sixth place.

References

External links
 
 

American male sprinters
Athletes (track and field) at the 2008 Summer Olympics
Olympic gold medalists for the United States in track and field
Olympic bronze medalists for the United States in track and field
African-American male track and field athletes
1984 births
Living people
Medalists at the 2008 Summer Olympics
People from Merrillville, Indiana
Track and field athletes from Indiana
Pan American Games silver medalists for the United States
Pan American Games medalists in athletics (track and field)
Athletes (track and field) at the 2007 Pan American Games
Medalists at the 2007 Pan American Games
21st-century African-American sportspeople
20th-century African-American people